These are some, but not all of the bridges of the City of Kyoto:

 Misono-bashi (御薗橋)
 Kamigamo Bridge
 Nakagamo-bashi
 Idzumoji-bashi
 Aoi-bashi
 Kojin-bashi
 Marutamachi-bashi
 Ebisugawa-bashi
 Nijo-hashi
 Sanjō Ōhashi
 Shijo-hashi or Gion-hashi
 Matsubara-hashi
 Gojo Bridge
 Shomen-bashi
 Shichijo-hashi
 Shiokoji-bashi

References

 Ponsonby-Fane, Richard A. B. (1956). Kyoto: The Old Capital of Japan, 794-1869. Kyoto: The Ponsonby Memorial Society.

List
Kyoto
Bridges, Kyoto
Bridges
Transport in Kyoto Prefecture